Naadodikal is a 1959 Indian Malayalam-language film, directed by S. Ramanathan and produced by T. K. Pareekutty. The film stars Prem Nawas and Ambika Sukumaran. The film had musical score by  V. Dakshinamoorthy.

Cast
 Prem Nawas
 Ambika Sukumaran
 T. R. Omana 
 Sukumari
 P. A. Thomas
 T. S. Muthaiah
 Adoor Pankajam
 Kottarakkara Sreedharan Nair
 S. A. Fareed

References

External links
 

1959 films
1950s Malayalam-language films